Novyye Kazanchi (Yañı Qaźansı) is a rural locality (a village) in Askinsky District, Bashkortostan, Russia. The population was 443 as of 2010. There are 8 streets.

Geography 
Novyye Kazanchi is located 46 km northwest of Askino (the district's administrative centre) by road. Kshlau-Yelga is the nearest rural locality.

References 

Rural localities in Askinsky District